Clavus squamiferus is a species of sea snail, a marine gastropod mollusc in the family Drilliidae.

Description

Distribution
This marine species occurs off New Caledonia.

References

  Kilburn R.N., Fedosov A. & Kantor Yu.I. (2014) The shallow-water New Caledonia Drilliidae of genus Clavus Montfort, 1810 (Mollusca: Gastropoda: Conoidea). Zootaxa 3818(1): 1-69

External links

squamiferus
Gastropods described in 2014